Smithtown is an unincorporated community and census-designated place (CDP) in northern Yadkin County, North Carolina, United States. It was first listed as a CDP in the 2020 census with a population of 224.

Located in the North Fall Creek Township, it was chartered in 1925 and named for three Smith Brothers who operated a small furniture factory and cabinet shop there. The community is in the East Bend ZIP code area. Until 1909 a post office known as Poindexter –  named after early settlers C.W. Poindexter, a postmaster, and S.A. Poindexter – served the area.

Smithtown was once on a main route linking Winston to Boonville. Today the community, centered on Smithtown Road, includes several historic homes. Prominent landmarks include two Methodist Churches that are less than a mile apart, Prospect United Methodist Church, which was organized in 1830, and New Home UMC, which was first built in 1885. Both churches used the same building from 1867–1885, but had separate pastors – Prospect was part of Methodist Episcopal Church, South and New Home the Methodist Episcopal Church.

Demographics

2020 census

Note: the US Census treats Hispanic/Latino as an ethnic category. This table excludes Latinos from the racial categories and assigns them to a separate category. Hispanics/Latinos can be of any race.

References

Unincorporated communities in Yadkin County, North Carolina
Unincorporated communities in North Carolina
Census-designated places in North Carolina
1925 establishments in North Carolina